Robert Harold Wasserman (11 February 1926, Schenectady, New York – 23 May 2018, Ithaca, New York) was a professor of veterinary medicine and a research scientist, known as the principal investigator leading the scientists credited with the discovery of calcium-binding proteins.

Biography
After graduating from high school in Schenectady, Wasserman matriculated in June 1943 at Union College, where he studied for three months before joining the Army Specialized Training Program and then the U. S. Army for basic training. In October 1944 he was sent overseas, where in December 1944 his division participated in operations of the Battle of the Bulge. After military service in WWII, he spent a year working on a farm in upstate New York and then matriculated at Cornell University. There he graduated with a bachelor's degree in microbiology in 1949. After a year at Michigan State University, where he graduated in August 1950 with a master's degree in microbiology, Wasserman returned to Cornell University. There he graduated in 1953 with a Ph.D. in nutritional microbiology.

From 1953 to 1957, Wasserman was employed at the University of Tennessee's Atomic Energy Commission facility, where he worked on the radiation biology program with Dr. Cyril L. Comar (1914–1979), the program's director. In spring 1958, Wasserman returned to Cornell University as an associate professor in the New York State College of Veterinary Medicine's newly created Laboratory of Radiation Biology. Comar, who had moved to Cornell, in 1957 was the Laboratory's director. Wasserman was promoted in 1963 to full professor and eventually retired from Cornell as professor emeritus.

In the 1990s, his laboratory made pioneering studies using ion microscopic imaging of calcium. He suggested "the presence of a vitamin D induced calcium channel in the intestine (later identified as the vitamin D regulated epithelial calcium channel, TRPV6)."

Wasserman was a member of the editorial boards of the Proceedings of the Society for Experimental Biology and Medicine, The Cornell Veterinarian, Calcified Tissue International, and the Journal of Nutrition. He was the author or co-author of more than 360 research articles, including 14 papers in Science and 7 papers in Nature. Wassermann was on sabbatical leave at the University of Copenhagen in 1964–1965, the University of Leeds in 1972, Woods Hole Marine Biological Laboratory in 1981, and the National Institute on Aging in 1982–1983. He participated in over 40 international conferences on calcium metabolism, bone health, calcification, and vitamin D.

Robert Wasserman married Marilyn Joyce Mintz in 1950 in Ithaca. He was predeceased by his wife after 63 years of marriage. Upon his death he was survived by three daughters and four grandchildren.

Awards and honors
 1964 — Guggenheim Fellowship (academic year 1964-1965 spent studying under Hans H. Ussing)
 1969 — Mead Johnson Award in Nutrition from the American Society for Nutrition
 1971 — Guggenheim Fellowship
 1974 — Burroughs Lectureship at Iowa State University
 1980 — Member of the National Academy of Sciences
 1987 — Burroughs Lectureship at Iowa State University
 1982 — Prix André Lichtwitz from the Institut National de la Santé et de la Recherche Médicale-Paris
 1989 — MERIT Award from the National Institute of Diabetes and Digestive and Kidney Diseases
 1990 — William F. Neuman Award of the American Society for Bone and Mineral Research
 1992 — Fellow of the American Society for Nutrition

Selected publications

References

 (This obituary notice erroneously states that Wasserman received his M.S. in 1951 — the correct year is 1950.)

External links
 

1926 births
2018 deaths
American physiologists
American nutritionists
Radiobiologists
Cornell University alumni
Michigan State University alumni
Cornell University faculty
Members of the United States National Academy of Sciences
Scientists from Schenectady, New York